Jacques de Kadt (30 July 1897, Oss – 16 April 1988, Santpoort) was a prominent and often controversial 20th Century Dutch political thinker, politician and man of letters. Born into a liberal Jewish family, he was the youngest son of a factory manager, Roelof de Kadt, and his wife Bertha Koppens. Author of numerous books and articles, his reputation was established by his book Het fascisme en de nieuwe vrijheid (Fascism and the New Freedom) which was published in 1939, shortly before the outbreak of the Second World War.

Early career

De Kadt's early political career was shaped, in part, by the influence of Rosa Luxemburg. He   joined the Dutch Communist Party, soon only to become disenchanted with it and, especially, with the political developments in the Soviet Union. In consequence, he left the Communist Party of Holland in 1924. He subsequently chronicled his embrace of, and break with, Communism in the first volume of his autobiography, Uit mijn communistentijd, published in Amsterdam in 1965 by his loyal publisher, G.A. van Oorschot. De Kadt developed into a trenchant and increasingly uncompromising critic of Stalinism, and articulated an independent line of socialist thought and political practice. This was expressed both in the content of his first major book, From Tsarism to Stalinism published in 1935 in Antwerp, and in his pivotal role in the formation of the Independent Socialist Party (Netherlands) (OSP). The book, which identified a continuity between the character of the Tsarist state and the Soviet political system under Stalin, contained an intimation of De Kadt's broader critique of twentieth century totalitarianism – a critique which was to define the nature of his subsequent political career.

Fascism 

The 1930s marked a significant period in the maturation of De Kadt's thought. He published widely on the major political developments of the time as well as on cultural, literary and philosophical topics. His writings addressed not only the threat posed by Fascism and Stalinism but included a major study of Georges Sorel, and numerous articles on notable (and not so well known) political and literary figures. De Kadt was a prodigiously productive – if often acerbic and polemical – writer who, at his best, was a writer of great elegance and style. Bart Tromp, an editor of a posthumously published collection of essays, referred to him as "an Orwell of Oss". In Het fascisme en de nieuwe vrijheid, De Kadt predicts the coming of the Second World War, the ultimate defeat of Fascism and the emergence  of the United States of America and the Soviet Union as the dominant global powers. The book also contains a normative defence of "western civilization" and its scientific underpinning. The book served as one source of inspiration for H. Floris Cohen's 1994 historiographical exploration of the 'scientific revolution'.

Parliamentary career 

De Kadt was a Labour Party (Partij van de Arbeid) member of the Dutch parliament from 1948 to 1963. He served for many years as the party's principal spokesman on foreign affairs, though his outspoken stance on Indonesian independence (of which he was a vigorous early protagonist) and his sharp, unqualified, opposition to Stalinism and the Soviet system ruled him out as a contender for the Ministerial position that was held by Joseph Luns. De Kadt was a regular radio commentator during these years. His contribution to Dutch public life and service was recognized in 1959 when he was awarded a knighthood in the Order of the Netherlands Lion.

References

Bibliographical references
Havenaar, R. (1990) De tocht naar het onbekende – Het politieke denken van Jacques de Kadt 
Pels, D. (1993) Het democratisch verschil. Jacques de Kadt en de nieuwe elite
Cohen, H. Floris (1994) The Scientific Revolution: A Historiographical Inquiry, Chicago, Chicago University Press

External links

http://www.vanoorschot.nl/?isbn=9789028240124
http://www.schrijversinfo.nl/kadtdejacques.html
http://www.dbnl.org/auteurs/auteur.php?id=kadt001

1897 births
1988 deaths
Dutch Jews
Dutch political writers
Jewish Dutch politicians
Jewish Dutch writers
Knights of the Order of the Netherlands Lion
Labour Party (Netherlands) politicians
Members of the House of Representatives (Netherlands)
People from Oss
20th-century Dutch journalists